State Trunk Highway 106 (also called Highway 106, STH-106 or WIS 106) is a state highway in the U.S. state of Wisconsin. It runs east–west in southeastern Wisconsin between Albion and Palmyra, Jefferson County.

Route description

Starting at WIS 73 near Albion, WIS 106 proceeds to travel eastward near the north shore of Lake Koshkonong. On its way, it runs through Busseyville. After leaving Lake Koshkonong, WIS 106 then meets WIS 26 at a diamond interchange. Along the way towards Fort Atkinson, it then travels along the north bank of the Rock River. In Fort Atkinson, it intersects US 12 and Bus. WIS 26. After that, it continues to travel eastward and then southeastward to Palmyra, meeting Hebron along the way. In Palmyra, it intersects WIS 59, and WIS 106 ends at this point.

Major intersections

See also

References

External links

WIS 106 Terminus Photos

106
Transportation in Dane County, Wisconsin
Transportation in Jefferson County, Wisconsin